Dolní Kralovice is a municipality and village in Benešov District in the Central Bohemian Region of the Czech Republic. It has about 900 inhabitants.

Administrative parts
Villages of Martinice u Dolních Kralovic, Střítež, Vraždovy Lhotice and Zahrádčice and the territory of the extinct village of Libčice are administrative parts of Dolní Kralovice.

References

Villages in Benešov District